The Southern Maori by-election of 1932 was a by-election during the 24th New Zealand Parliament. The election was held on 3 August 1932.

The seat of Southern Maori became vacant following the death of the sitting member Tuiti Makitanara.

Six candidates contested the seat, which was won by Eruera Tirikatene. This was the first seat ever won by the Ratana party.

Results
The following table gives the election results:

Tirikatene stayed in parliament until his death in 1967. He eventually joined the Labour Party after they merged with Ratana.

References

Southern Maori 1932
1932 elections in New Zealand
Māori politics